The church of Saint George (pronounced Surp Gevork) is located centrally in the village of Garnahovit, Aragatsotn Province, Armenia. Its imposing architecture dominates the surrounding village and landscape.

Architecture 
St. Gevorg has a single large Byzantine-style red tile, octagonal umbrella dome that is centered over the church. The style of domed roof is uncommon in Armenia, especially on larger structures. The dome sits above an octagonal drum that is pierced by twelve small windows; pairs of windows on each of the four sides, and single windows on the other four sides. The church was renovated at least once.

References

External links 

About Church of Garnahovit

Armenian Apostolic churches in Armenia
Tourist attractions in Aragatsotn Province
Churches in Aragatsotn Province
7th-century churches in Armenia